{{Infobox college basketball team
| women=yes
| name = Drake Bulldogs
| current =
| logo = Drake Bulldogs "D" logo.svg
| logo_size = 150
| university = Drake University
| conference = Missouri Valley
| location = Des Moines, Iowa
| coach = Allison Pohlman
| tenure = 2nd
| arena = Knapp Center
| capacity = 6,424
| nickname = Bulldogs
| h_pattern_b = _thinsidesonwhite
| h_pattern_s = _blanksides2
| h_body = 1B4677
| h_shorts = 1B4677
| a_pattern_b = _whitesides
| a_pattern_s = _whitesides
| a_body = 1B4677
| a_shorts = 1B4677
| NCAAchampion =
| NCAAfinalfour =
| NCAAeliteeight = 1982
| NCAAsweetsixteen = 1982, 2002
| NCAAsecondround = 1982, 1986, 1995, 2002
| NCAAtourneys = 1982, 1984, 1986, 1995, 1997, 1998, 2000, 2001, 2002, 2007, 2017, 2018, 2019, 2023
| conference_tournament = Missouri Valley: 1995, 1997, 1998, 2000, 2007, 2017, 2018, 2023
| conference_season = Gateway1984

Missouri Valley1997, 1998, 2000, 2001, 2008, 2017, 2018, 2019''
}}

The Drake Bulldogs women's basketball''' team represents Drake University, located in Des Moines, Iowa, in NCAA Division I basketball competition. Drake competes in the Missouri Valley Conference.

Record By year
Drake was awarded a forfeit victory over Valparaiso during the 1995–96 season due to Valparaiso's use of an ineligible player. Drake originally lost that game 79–80.

 

Totals updated through the end of the 2022–23 regular season.

Postseason

NCAA tournament history
The Bulldogs have a 6–14 tournament record.

Women's National Invitation Tournament

MVC All-Centennial team
In 2006–07, the Missouri Valley Conference celebrated its centennial as the nation's second-oldest NCAA Division I conference. As part of the celebration, The Valley named All-Centennial teams for each of the sponsored sports. Six of the 35 women's basketball players named were from Drake's program.

References

External links